The San Jose Church in La Mesa, New Mexico is a historic church building at 317 Josephine Street. It was built between 1868 and 1877 and added to the National Register of Historic Places in 1993.

It is a small adobe church.

See also

National Register of Historic Places listings in Doña Ana County, New Mexico

References

Roman Catholic churches in New Mexico
Churches on the National Register of Historic Places in New Mexico
Mission Revival architecture in New Mexico
Roman Catholic churches completed in 1868
Churches in Doña Ana County, New Mexico
National Register of Historic Places in Doña Ana County, New Mexico
Adobe churches in New Mexico
19th-century Roman Catholic church buildings in the United States